Chen Yue is a Chinese female  track cyclist, and part of the national team. She competed in the team pursuit event at the 2009 UCI Track Cycling World Championships.

References

Year of birth missing (living people)
Living people
Chinese track cyclists
Chinese female cyclists
Place of birth missing (living people)